Jalen Da'Quan Carter (born April 4, 2001) is an American football defensive tackle for the Georgia Bulldogs. He was a two-time CFP national champion with the Bulldogs, winning in 2021 and 2022. Jalen Carter will be entering the 2023 NFL draft which will happen next April 27-29.

High school career 
Carter was born on April 4, 2001, Apopka, Florida, later attending Apopka High School. As a senior, he had 12 sacks, 64 tackles, and a touchdown. A five-star recruit ranked the 18th overall prospect in his class, Carter committed to play college football at the University of Georgia.

College career 
Carter played in eight games as a freshman, recording 12 tackles and a touchdown reception. In Carter's sophomore season, he tallied 31 tackles and three sacks in 12 games. This performance earned him a spot on the 2021 All-SEC football team. Georgia won the National Championship that year over Alabama. Carter declared for the 2023 NFL Draft after the 2023 College Football Playoff National Championship, in which the Bulldogs also won.

2023 car crash 
On January 15, 2023, at approximately 2:45 am a serious car crash occurred resulting in the deaths of University of Georgia staff member Chandler Louise LeCroy and football player Devin Alex Willock. The collision, which occurred on Barnett Shoals Road in East Athens after the Bulldogs had been celebrating their second consecutive national championship earlier in the evening, is believed by police to have occurred as a result of street racing involving LeCroy, who was driving a 2021 Ford Expedition, and Carter, who was driving a 2021 Jeep Trackhawk. LeCroy, whose blood alcohol content was 0.197, more than twice the legal limit at the time of the crash, veered off the road after failing to make a proper turn at a high speed. She struck at least two utility poles, downing one of them, and trees before the car came to a stop against the door of an apartment building, blocking the resident inside until the wreckage could be cleared away. Willock, who wasn't wearing his seat belt, was ejected from the vehicle. Passengers Warran McClendon and Victoria Bowles survived but were injured, with Bowles, who was not wearing a seat belt, reportedly in critical condition. It's estimated that both cars reached speeds of more than 100 mph. LeCroy's speedometer indicated she'd been at traveling at 83 mph when it broke during the crash. Carter faces charges of reckless driving and street racing. Carter had previously been cited for traffic violations three times during the fall semester, twice by campus authorities and once by Athens police for traveling at 89 mph in a 45 mph zone. 

On March 1, 2023, an arrest warrant was issued for Carter for his involvement in the accident. That night at 11:33 p.m., Carter turned himself in, and was released on a $4,000 bond 16 minutes later.

References

External links 
 
 Georgia Bulldogs bio

Living people
2001 births
African-American players of American football
All-American college football players
American football defensive tackles
Georgia Bulldogs football players
Players of American football from Florida